Mihaja Ramiarinarivo (born 6 January 1997), better known by his stage name Oboy (stylised as OBOY and occasionally as ΩBØY), is a French rapper of Malagasy origin.
He raps in the mumble rap style.

Biography
Born in Madagascar, Oboy lived in Villeneuve-Saint-Georges, Val-de-Marne, from the age of six. The eldest and only son of three children, his father introduced him to a wide variety of music, including Michael Jackson, Bob Marley and Tupac Shakur.

At the age of 17, members of Oboy's former collective Way Boto invited him to record music, which eventually evolved into his first EP, Olyside – a cloud rap and trap recording. It was followed in March 2018 by Southside, and in July 2019 by his first full-length album, Omega.

Oboy's second album No crari went to number 3 on the French Albums Chart in September 2021. The single "TDB" topped the French Singles Chart for five weeks in August and September and received 68 million streams by December, earning it Platinum status for topping 50 million streams.

Oboy has described ASAP Rocky and Migos as stylistic influences.

Discography

Albums

EPs

Mixtapes
with Way Boto 
2016: Hoverboard

Solo

Singles

Featured in

Other songs

References

External links
Official website

1997 births
Living people
French rappers
Rappers from Val-de-Marne
People from Villeneuve-Saint-Georges
French people of Malagasy descent
Mumble rappers